Hugh Potter Baker (January 20, 1878 – May 24, 1950) was a graduate of the Michigan State College of Agriculture; Yale's School of Forestry (M.F., 1904); and the University of Munich (Ph.D., Economics, 1910). He was the second and fourth Dean of the New York State College of Forestry at Syracuse University, from 1912 to 1920 and 1930 to 1933.

Baker previously had worked with Gifford Pinchot at the United States Bureau of Forestry and Forest Service (1901–04). Immediately before coming to Syracuse, Baker was Professor of Forestry at the Pennsylvania State College.

After his second stint as Dean of the College of Forestry, Baker went on to become President of Massachusetts State College (1933–47), presently known as the University of Massachusetts Amherst.

Selected works
"The Prairie Farmer and Forestry" (1907)
"Some Forestry Problems of the Prairies of the Middle West" (1908)
"Native and Planted Timber of Iowa" (1908)
"Forestry and Its Relation to Horticulture" (1908)
"Why Pennsylvania Needs Forestry" Forest Leaves, Vol. XII (1909)
"The Third Conservation Congress Held at Kansas City, Missouri" (1911)
"Syracuse University and the City of Syracuse" (1914)
"Forestry and Reconstruction in New York" (1919)
"The Manufacture of Pulp and Paper as an American Industry" (1920)
"Fundamental Silvicultural Measures Necessary to Insure Forest Lands Remaining Reasonably Productive After Logging", co-authored by Edward F. McCarthy, Journal of Forestry, Vol. XVIII (1920)

Honors 

 A dormitory at the University of Massachusetts Amherst, Baker Hall, is named in his honor.
 Baker Laboratory (formally, the Hugh P. Baker Memorial Laboratory) at the State University of New York College of Environmental Science and Forestry, successor to the New York State College of Forestry at Syracuse University, is named after him.

References

External links 
 Archives from Hugh Baker's tenure as Dean of the New York State College of Forestry, located in the Archives of the SUNY College of Environmental Sciences and Forestry

State University of New York College of Environmental Science and Forestry faculty
Leaders of the State University of New York College of Environmental Science and Forestry
New York State College of Forestry
Michigan State University alumni
Yale School of Forestry & Environmental Studies alumni
Ludwig Maximilian University of Munich alumni
History of forestry education
American foresters
Leaders of the University of Massachusetts Amherst
Iowa State University faculty
1878 births
1950 deaths
Scientists from New York (state)
American expatriates in Germany